Kuttuvan Kotai, also spelled Kothai/Kodai, was a Chera ruler of early historic (pre-Pallava) south India.

Silver coins bearing a portrait facing right with Tamil-Brahmi legend "Ku-t-tu-va-n Ko-tai" have been discovered from Amaravati riverbed in Karur, central Tamil Nadu. The reverse of the coins are blank. The coin seems to be an imitation of the Roman portrait head coins. Whether these coins were used as a currency in trade transactions is not clear.

Scholars identify Kotai with "Cheraman Kuttuvan Kotai" mentioned in the early Tamil text Purananuru, 54. This Chera is mentioned as Kotai, not as Kuttuvan Kotai, in the body of the poem, but the appended colophon gives the full name "Kuttuvan Kotai". The Chera is eulogised in the Puram by Konattu Ericchalur Matalur Maturai-kumarananar.

Kuttuvan was probably an ancient title for the Chera rulers of south India. Early Tamil texts refer to "Kuttuvar" as a kingship group and "Kuttanatu" as the country of the Kuttuva people. The term Kuttanatu is indicated in the entry in Periplus Maris Erythraei, referring to "Cottonora", ‘where the pepper grows’. The estuarine region Kottayam and Alappuzha districts of Kerala is now known as Kuttanatu.

References 

Chera kings
People of the Chera kingdom
Tamil monarchs
History of Tamil Nadu
Ancient Indian monarchs
History of Kerala